Indian Arrows (formerly known as Pailan Arrows) was an Indian developmental football club that competed in the I-League. The club was formed by the All India Football Federation in 2010, with a main goal of nurturing young Indian football talents.

After disbanding in 2013, the project was revived as Indian Arrows in 2017. In September 2022, the technical committee of All India Football Federation decided to discontinue the participation of the Indian Arrows in the I-League because of the difficulty in fulfilling the AFC Licensing criteria. Instead, the funding was decided to invest in creating a new Elite Youth League in the country .

History

AIFF XI (2010–2011)

2010–11 season
The club was founded as the AIFF XI in 2010 under the recommendation of then India head coach Bob Houghton and All India Football Federation president Praful Patel after Bob noticed that almost all the India U19 and India U23 players were on the bench during the I-League season and were never getting any game time. The club was originally slated to join the I-League 2nd Division but after the disbanding of Mahindra United the AIFF allowed AIFF XI into the I-League automatically. The club participated in their first competition in 2010 which was the Federation Cup and played their first ever professional match on 21 September against JCT FC, in which AIFF XI won 1–0 with Malsawmfela scoring the first goal in the team's history. The team finished third in the group in the end, missing out on going to the next round by four points. The club then participated in their first I-League match on 3 December 2010 against Chirag United in which the club lost 1–2 and with Lalrindika Ralte scoring the first goal for the club in the league. The club then earned their first points on 8 December 2010 against ONGC F.C. after drawing 1–1. On 11 January 2011 it was announced that AIFF XI would change their name to Indian Arrows which would take effect on 1 February 2011. Arrows finished the 2010–11 I-League season in 9th place.

Pailan Arrows (2011–2013)

2011–12 season
The summer of 2011 would be a busy one for the club. The club changed their name to Pailan Arrows on 15 June 2011 after the All India Football Federation reached an agreement with Pailan Group to sponsor the team. With the deal Pailan Arrows was also relocated to Kolkata and the Salt Lake Stadium. Then on 13 August 2012 head coach Desmond Bulpin was sacked by the club due to his "style of football" while former India national football team coach Sukhwinder Singh was signed to take over the club. The club also lost many of the stars of the previous season like Lalrindika Ralte, Jeje Lalpekhlua (top scorer for Pailan and among Indians in 2010–11), Manandeep Singh and Gurpreet Singh Sandhu. The club again participated in the Federation Cup in 2011 where Pailan won two matches but lost one which meant that they would finish 2nd behind Salgaocar and thus meant Pailan were knocked out in the group stage again. Pailan Arrows then began the 2011–12 I-League campaign against Mohun Bagan at the Salt Lake Stadium on 23 October 2012 in which they lost 1–3 after Lalrozama Fanai gave them the early lead. On 7 February 2012 Sukhwinder Singh resigned as coach of Pailan Arrows due to personal reasons, at this point also Pailan had not won a single match in I-League and had only managed eight draws in 17 matches. Assistant coach Sujit Chakravarty took over the reins as head coach for the remainder of the season. Towards the end of the season Pailan managed to win two matches, one against Chirag United Club Kerala and another against HAL to finished the season in 13th place out of 14 teams but since they are a developmental team, Pailan were not relegated.

2012–13 season
After the disastrous season Pailan endured, the club and All India Football Federation signed Australian Arthur Papas as the new permanent head coach of the India U23 and Pailan Arrows on 24 May 2012. Papas came to the club after coaching his former club, Oakleigh Cannons FC, to the 2011 Victorian Premier League runners-up title.

Disbanding
On 29 August 2013 it was announced that Pailan Arrows had been disbanded by the All India Football Federation as the club sponsors, Pailan Group, could not financially support the team.

Revival as Indian Arrows (2017–2022)
After successful hosting of 2017 FIFA U-17 World Cup, AIFF revived the project as Indian Arrows with the aim of giving regular game time to U–17 world cup players as a team, and fielded the team in 2017–18 I-League. They were immune from relegation. Despite being praised for their competitive showings in 2017–18 I-League season, they finished bottom of the league with 15 points from 18 games. In the 2018–19 I League, with six wins and three drews, the Arrows finished eighth in the table among 11 teams. They qualified for the 2019 Super Cup by defeating Kerala Blasters 2–0. Due to the Coronavirus pandemic, the 2019–20 season was cancelled after 16 matches and the Arrows were placed at the bottom. In the 2021–21 I League season, they were placed tenth in the league.

Disbanding
In September 2022, the AIFF executive committee accepted the recommendation of its new technical committee, to discontinue Indian Arrows because of the difficulty in fulfilling the AFC Licensing criteria. They also announced that the finances used for the Indian Arrows will be invested in creating a new Elite Youth League in the country.

Crest and colours
The club's colours were blue and white, just like the India national football team. During the first season Pailan Arrows started with a dark blue kit but eventually during the 2010–11 season the club started using a normal blue kit with black shorts. For the 2011–12 season Pailan used a dark blue jersey and a white kit with black or red socks.

Kit manufacturers and shirt sponsors

In october 2018, Government of Odisha signed Rs.50 million sponsorship deal with AIFF for the Arrows. The sponsorship deal will also cover India's under-15 football team. As part of the deal, the state government will host the Arrows and under-15 national team at the Kalinga Stadium in Bhubaneswar. The deal also covers the two teams’ stay in Bhubaneswar, providing them with the ground facility as well as boarding/lodging during the I-league and off-season.

Stadium
For the 2010–11 I-League season the club played at the Tau Devi Lal Stadium in Gurgaon, Haryana when they were originally due to play at the Ambedkar Stadium in Delhi but due to the pitch condition the club was moved to Gurgaon. After relocating to Kolkata the club started to play at the Salt Lake Stadium which is also home to East Bengal, Mohun Bagan and Prayag United. In 2017–18, the team played in Goa and Delhi. In 2018–19, they used the Barabati Stadium and Kalinga Stadium. Kalinga Stadium in Bhubaneswar, Odisha were the last home base of the Indian Arrows before getting disbanded in September 2022.

Notable former players
For all former or notable Indian Arrows players with a Wikipedia article, see: Indian Arrows players.

Final staff

Team records

Overview

Overall records

Head coaching history
This is a full list of Indian Arrows's coaches and their records, from 2010 until they were disbanded in 2022.

Only competitive matches are counted. Wins, losses and draws are results at the final whistle; the results of penalty shoot-outs are not counted.

See also
 Elite League
 Junior National Football Championship
 Football in India
 Indian football league system

References

External links
Pailan Arrows at Goal.com
Indian Arrows at GSA

Pailan Arrows
Football clubs in India
Association football clubs established in 2010
I-League clubs
2010 establishments in India
2022 disestablishments in India
India national football team
Indian Arrows FC
Association football clubs disestablished in 2022
Defunct football clubs in India